Allen Chapel African Methodist Episcopal Church may refer to:

 Allen Chapel African Methodist Episcopal Church (Lincoln, Illinois)
 Allen Chapel African Methodist Episcopal Church (Terre Haute, Indiana)
 Allen Chapel A.M.E. Church (Murfreesboro, Tennessee)
 Allen Chapel AME Church (Fort Worth, Texas)

See also
List of African Methodist Episcopal churches